Frederick Christopher Klein (born March 14, 1979) is an American actor who is best known for playing Paul Metzler in Election, Chris "Oz" Ostreicher in the American Pie comedy teen films, the serial killer Cicada on The Flash and most recently as Bill Townsend in the Netflix series Sweet Magnolias.

Early life
Klein was raised in Brookfield, Illinois. He is of German, Irish, and English descent. His mother, Terese (née Bergen), is a kindergarten teacher, and his father, Fred Klein, is an engineer. Klein was the second of three children. His older sister, Debbie, was born in 1978, and his younger brother, Timothy, was born in 1982. As a child, Klein had his first on stage experience by singing This Little Light of Mine in a community theater at the Sheraton Convention Center in Chicago. He lived in the town for thirteen years before his family moved to Omaha, Nebraska. At Millard West High School in Omaha, Klein acted in his high school's performance of West Side Story, played cornerback and linebacker for the football team, and swam on the Millard West Swim Team. In his senior year, Klein was offered his first professional acting job by director Alexander Payne, who was scouting Omaha, his hometown, as a potential filming location for the film Election.  He attended  Texas Christian University (TCU) in Fort Worth, Texas.

Career

After auditioning for Election, Payne chose Klein and they began filming. The film was released in April 1999, to positive reviews. Soon after, Klein found steady work in the film industry while briefly attending TCU, where he studied theater and was a member of the Lambda Chi Alpha fraternity. He was next seen in American Pie, acting as Christopher Russell Ostreicher, which opened on July 9, 1999, and was a box office success. The following year Klein starred in Here on Earth alongside LeeLee Sobieski and Josh Hartnett (2000). Klein reprised his role in American Pie 2 (2001) and American Reunion (2012), but was not in American Wedding reportedly due to scheduling conflicts.  In 2002, Klein had a role in the Mel Gibson Vietnam War film We Were Soldiers. Klein starred in the 2002, remake of the film Rollerball, but the film was a massive critical and financial failure.  Klein has also appeared in several teen movies, including Just Friends (2005) and American Dreamz (2006).

In 2014, Klein was cast as an American pilot in the Damien Lay film The Uberkanone. He co-starred in the 2014, comedy indie film Authors Anonymous with Kaley Cuoco. In 2018, Klein was cast as Cicada, the main villain of the fifth season of superhero television series The Flash.

Personal life
In January 2000, Klein and actress Katie Holmes began dating. The couple became engaged around Christmas of 2003. The couple called off the engagement and ended their relationship in March 2005.

Klein met Laina Rose Thyfault, a travel agent, in 2011 at a mutual friend's wedding. They got engaged in December 2014, after three years of dating and married eight months later on August 9, 2015, in Montana. In March 2016, Klein announced in a tweet that he and his wife were expecting their first child together. Their son Frederick Easton was born July 23, 2016. The couple also have a daughter Isla Rose, who was born May 26, 2018.

Klein was arrested for drunk driving on February 5, 2005, in San Diego County and again in Los Angeles on June 16, 2010. On June 21, 2010, it was announced that Klein had checked into the Cirque Lodge to begin a 30-day alcohol addiction program. Klein's publicist explained that "after recent events, Chris was forced to take a clear look at a problem he has been trying to deal with himself for years. He understands now that he cannot beat this addiction alone."

Filmography

Awards and nominations
Chicago Film Critics Association
2000: Nominated, "Most Promising Actor" – American Pie
Teen Choice Awards
2000: Nominated, "Choice Breakout Performance" – American Pie
Young Hollywood Awards
2001: Won, "Male Superstar of Tomorrow"

References

External links

 

1979 births
Living people
20th-century American male actors
21st-century American male actors
American male film actors
American male television actors
American people of English descent
American people of German descent
American people of Irish descent
Male actors from Illinois
Male actors from Omaha, Nebraska
People from Hinsdale, Illinois
Texas Christian University alumni
People from Brookfield, Illinois